Yushkov is a Russian masculine surname, its feminine counterpart is Yushkova. It may refer to
Aleksei Yushkov (1967–1996), Russian football player
Angelina Yushkova (born 1979), Russian gymnast
Ivan Yushkov (born 1981), Russian shot putter
Pavel Yushkov (born 1979), Russian football player

Russian-language surnames